The 2012 Kabaddi World Championship was the first Kabaddi World Cup held for women.
It was organised by The Government of Bihar and the Amateur Kabaddi Federation of India
 It was held at Patna from 1 to 4 March 2012 at the Patliputra Sports Complex, Kankarbagh. Hosts India won the World Cup defeating Iran in the finals.

Teams
A total of 16 teams took part in the World Cup.
The teams are :

 (Host Nation)

Venue 
All the matches were held at Patliputra Sports Complex, Kankarbagh, Bihar.

Groups
The teams were divided into 4 groups of 4 teams each:

Group stage

Group A

Group B

Group C

Group D

Knockout stages

Schedule and results

1 March
2012 17:00 hours M-01 India V/S Korea Pool – A India won by 38–14 points

2 March 2012

08:00 hours M-02 Thailand V/S Turkmenistan Pool – B Thailand won by 64–19 points
08:00 hours M-03 Iran V/S Nepal Pool – D Iran won by 53–20 points
09:00 hours M-04 Bangladesh V/S Malaysia Pool – C Bangladesh won by 70–30 points
09:00 hours M-05 Taipei Vs Mexico Pool – A Taipei won by 88–21 points
10:00 hours M-06 Japan V/S Canada Pool – B Japan won by 29–08 points
10:00 hours M-07 Sri Lanka V/S Italy Pool – C Sri Lanka won by 75–13 points

EVENING SESSION

2 March 2012

15:00 hours M-08 Indonesia V/S USA Pool – D Indonesia won by 78–31 points
15:00 hours M-09 Japan V/S Turkmenistan Pool – B Japan won by 51–10 points
16:00 hours M-10 Sri Lanka V/S Malaysia Pool – C Sri Lanka won by 74–11 points
16:00 hours M-11 India V/S Taipei Pool – A India won by 43–18 points
17:00 hours M-12 Korea V/S Mexico Pool – A Korea won by 72–14 points
17:00 hours M-13 Thailand V/S Canada Pool – B Thailand won by 44–14 points
18:00 hours M-14 Bangladesh V/S Italy Pool – C Bangladesh won by 85–11 points
18:00 hours M-15 Indonesia V/S Nepal Pool – D Indonesia won by 60–30 points
19:00 hours M-16 Iran V/S USA Pool – D Iran won by 50–38 points
3 March 2012

08:00 hours M-17 Iran V/S Indonesia Pool – D Iran won by 57–28 points
08:00 hours M-18 Korea V/S Taipei Pool – A Korea won by 33–29 points
09:00 hours M-19 Malaysia V/S Italy Pool – C Italy won by 57–55 points
09:00 hours M-20 Thailand V/S Japan Pool – B Thailand won by 21–20 points
10:00 hours M-21 Bangladesh V/S Sri Lanka Pool – C Bangladesh won by 38–26 points
10:00 hours M-22 India V/S Mexico Pool – A India won by 49–23 points
11:00 hours M-23 Nepal V/S USA Pool – D Nepal won by 72–50 points
11:00 hours M-24 Turkmenistan V/S Canada Pool – B Canada won by 68–27 points

EVENING SESSION

3 March 2012
Quarter-finals

16:00 hours M-25 India V/s Indonesia India won by 66–20 points
17:00 hours M-26 Japan V/s Bangladesh Japan won by 17–15 points
18:00 hours M-27 Thailand V/s Sri Lanka Thailand won by 30–18 points
19:00 hours M-28 Iran V/s Korea Iran won by 40–16 points

4 March 2012
Semi-finals

15:30 hours M-29 Thailand V/s Iran Iran won by 46–26 points
16:30 hours M-30 India V/s Japan India won by 59–20 points
 
FINAL

18:00 hours M-31 winner of match no. 29
Vs India won by 25–19 points
Winner of Match No −30

References 

International sports competitions hosted by India
Kabaddi competitions in India
2012 in Indian women's sport